As You Were is the debut solo studio album by English singer and songwriter Liam Gallagher. It was released on 6 October 2017 by Warner Bros. Records. A critical and commercial success, the album debuted at number one in the UK, outselling the rest of the top 10 of the UK Albums Chart combined and achieving gold certification in its first week. It has since been certified platinum in the UK. It also achieved the highest single-week vinyl sales in 20 years, with 16,000. In part for his work on the album, producer Greg Kurstin also won the 2018 Grammy Award for Producer of the Year, Non-Classical.

Background
The album was announced in June 2017 with the release of the single "Wall of Glass". Gallagher also revealed that he would launch his first solo tour of the United States and Canada to support the album's release. Once he completed the lyrics, Liam told NME that he cried his eyes out and thought 'I'm back'. The album's title comes from the sign-off Gallagher often used for his Twitter posts. Gallagher worked with producers Greg Kurstin, Andrew Wyatt and Dan Grech-Marguerat on the album, with Kurstin producing the tracks "Wall of Glass", "Paper Crown", "Come Back to Me", and "Doesn't Have to Be That Way", Wyatt producing "Chinatown", and Grech-Marguerat producing the remaining tracks.

Critical reception

As You Were received generally positive reviews from critics. At Metacritic, which assigns a normalised rating out of 100 to reviews from mainstream publications, the album received an average score of 71, based on 24 reviews.

Stephen Thomas Erlewine from AllMusic was highly positive about the record in his four-star review, saying, "As You Were doesn't sound retro even though it is, in essence, a throwback to a throwback -- a re-articulation of Liam's '90s obsession with the '60s. That production does Gallagher a favor but so does Kurstin's presence as a co-songwriter, helping to rein in Liam's wandering ear and sharpen his melodies. Ranging from the icy onslaught of "Wall of Glass" to the stark swirl of "Chinatown" this is his best record in nearly a decade, and they add up to an album that illustrates exactly who Liam Gallagher is as an artist. Now in his middle age, he's a richer, nuanced singer than he was during Oasis's heyday, yet he's retained his charisma and, unlike his brother, he favors color and fire in his records, elements that not only enhance this fine collection of songs but make this the best post-Oasis album from either Gallagher to date." Halina Watts from the Daily Mirror was also very positive towards the record, scoring the album five stars and saying, "'As You Were' is the legendary rocker at his very best" and that the album was "well worth the wait". She went on to describe "Chinatown" as a "catchy uplifting poem to the capital" and "For What It's Worth" and "Paper Crown" as "fantastic ballads". Watts rounded off the review by saying, "Bring on album two".

Accolades

Commercial performance
The album was released in numerous formats, from digital versions to vinyl, CD, and a "special box set" that includes a colorized vinyl record, an "exclusive seven-inch, hardback book and an art print by Klaus Voormann, the artist behind the Beatles' Revolver". The track listing was revealed by Gallagher with the release of the album's second single "Chinatown".

As You Were sold over 103,000 units in its first week in the United Kingdom. It is the ninth-fastest selling debut of the decade within the nation. In 2018, the album was certified Platinum with sales of over  300,000 units in the UK. In the United States, it opened at number 30 on the Billboard 200 with 15,000 album-equivalent units, including 14,000 traditional sales. This marked a successful comeback for Gallagher, as both Beady Eye albums had failed to reach number one in the UK, and their second album had failed to chart at all in the US.

Track listing

Notes
  signifies original song production.
  signifies original demo production.

Personnel
Credits adapted from liner notes.

Musicians
 Liam Gallagher – lead vocals , acoustic guitar 
 Greg Kurstin – bass, drums, acoustic guitar, electric guitar, harmonica, percussion, mellotron, piano, organ, tanpura 
 Dan Grech-Marguerat – programming 
 Davey Badiuk – programming 
 Mike Moore – electric guitar , bass 
 Dan McDougall – drums, bass, acoustic guitar, electric guitar, keyboards 
 Martin Slattery – keyboards, saxophone 
 Ben Edwards – trumpet 
 Mark Brown – saxophone 
 Mike Kearsey – trombone 
 Sally Herbert – violin, string arrangement , brass arrangement 
 Ian Burdge – cello 
 Rachel Robson – viola 
 Tom Pigott Smith – violin 
 Andrew Wyatt – acoustic guitar , drum programming, piano, bass, synth, additional guitar, production , backing vocals 
 Drew McConnell – bass 
 Jay Mehler – acoustic guitar, electric guitar 
 Christian Madden – keyboards 
 Michael Tighe – acoustic guitar 
 Bridget Sarai – backing vocals 
 Vicky Akintola – backing vocals 

Production
 Greg Kurstin – production, engineering , mixing 
 Dan Grech-Marguerat – production, engineering , mixing 
 Andrew Wyatt – production 
 Iain Archer – original song production 
 Dan McDougall – original demo production 
 Alex Pasco – engineering 
 Julian Burg – engineering 
 Ben Mclusky – engineering , engineering assistance 
 Joseph Rogers – engineering 
 Joe Rodgers – engineering 
 Joel Davies – engineering assistance 
 Charles Haydon Hicks – engineering assistance 
 Matt Mysko – engineering assistance 
 Mark "Spike" Stent – mixing 
 Richard Woodcraft – brass section recording 
 Julian Simmons – brass section recording 
 Brian Lucey – mastering 

Design
 Hedi Slimane – cover shot, photography
 Liam Gallagher – art direction, design
 Richard Welland – art direction, design
 Pixie Higson – photography commissioning

Charts

Weekly charts

Year-end charts

Certifications

References

External links
 

2017 debut albums
Liam Gallagher albums
Albums produced by Greg Kurstin
Warner Records albums